The University of Cagayan Valley (UCV) is a private non-sectarian university in Tuguegarao, Cagayan Valley, Philippines. It was formerly known as Cagayan Teachers College, then as Cagayan Colleges Tuguegarao, until the name changed again to University of Cagayan Valley.

Historical background
After the Second World War, there was a shortage of teachers. Most schools in the Philippines had been destroyed and were in the processes of being rebuilt. Moreover, there were no institutions of higher learning in Tuguegarao nor in nearby area. This meant someone had to go to Manila to obtain a college education. Motivated by this, Dr. Matias Ponce Perez, Sr. founded Cagayan Teachers College in April 1948.

The Cagayan Teachers College started modestly. Its course offerings during its first year of academic operation (1948–49) were limited to Elementary Teacher's Certificates and Bachelors of Science in education. Soon after, other courses were offered.

Since the institution had begun to offer courses in fields other than education, the institution's name was changed to Cagayan Colleges Tuguegarao in 1983.

In 2002, the institution was deputized by the Commission on Higher Education (CHED) to offer the Expanded Tertiary Education Equivalency and Accreditation Program (ETEEAP) under the BS Criminology Program. Also, the institution was designated by the Technical Education and Skills Development Authority (TESDA) as the Assessment Center for Computer Hardware Servicing NCII and venue for Skills Assessment in Housekeeping NCII and Automotive Servicing NCII.

In response to pressure from stakeholders, the institution opened the College of Health in 2004 with two programs: Bachelor of Science in Nursing and Diploma in Midwifery.

With the belief that the institution could become a university, the board of trustees and the management were inspired to submit an intention for university status. The status was awarded to the institution through CHED Resolution No. 186-2010 dated July 14, 2010, of the Commission En Banc, which changed the name Cagayan Colleges Tuguegarao to University of Cagayan Valley.

The First University Assembly was held on July 19, 2010. Subsequently, on September 15, 2010, Dr. Victor V. Perez was installed as the first University President.

On September 5, 2019, Dr. Victor V. Perez, after 39 years of long and dedicated service, bequeathed the University Presidency to Dr. Esther Susan N. Perez-Mari.

To sustain its university status and keep up with global requirements, the university built a four-story laboratory building in 2013.

On July 24, 2014, the university launched its intention to be certified for International Standard Organization (ISO) 9001:2008 Quality Management System by the British Standard Institution (BSI).

On October 7, 2015, BSI issued its Certificate of Registration on ISO 9001-2008 Quality Management System with Certificate No. FS 636133 to the University of Cagayan Valley.

Accreditation
UCV is ISO Quality Management System Certified 9000:2015 by British Standards Institution (BSI), the College of Maritime Education is also ISO certified by Det Norske Veritas (DNV) of Oslo, Norway, and programs are accredited by Philippine Association of Colleges and Universities Commission on Accreditation (PACUCOA).

The university is also accredited by TESDA, which offers Technical and Vocational Education and Training Program (TVET) under the Technical Education and Skills Development Authority and Commission on Higher Education (CHED).

BSI Quality Management System - ISO 9001:2015
On July 24, 2014, the university launched its intention to be certified for International Standard Organization (ISO) 9001:2008 Quality Management System with British Standard Institution (BSI).

On October 7, 2015, through painstaking challenges and hard work, BSi finally issued its Certificate of Registration on ISO 9001-2008 Quality Management System with Certificate No. FS 636133 to the University of Cagayan Valley.

ISO STD 0029 Certified by DNV for Maritime Education
The College of Maritime Education, which offers Bachelor of Science in Marine Engineering and Bachelor of Science in Marine Transportation, is [ISO 9001] STD 0029 Certified by DNV (Det Norske Veritas) Norway.

PACUCOA 
The following are programs accredited by the Philippine Association of Colleges and Universities Commission on Accreditation (PACUCOA):

Curricular offerings

Graduate school programs
Doctor of Philosophy in Human Resource Development, Educational Management
Doctor of Philosophy in Criminal Justice with specialization in Criminology
Doctor of Public Administration
Doctor of Jurisprudence/Juris Doctor/Doctor of Law
Master of Arts in Education
Master in Business Administration
Master in Public Administration
Master of Science in Criminology
Master of Science in Hospitality Management
Master of Engineering

Post baccalaureate program
Bachelor of Laws and Letters

Undergraduate programs
Bachelor of Arts in English and Political Science
Bachelor of Public Administration
Bachelor of Science in Social Work
Bachelor of Physical Education
Bachelor of Science in Accounting Technology
Bachelor of Science in Business Administration, with majors in Financial Management, Human Resource Management and Marketing Management
Bachelor of Science in Criminology
Bachelor of Science in Criminology through ETEEAP
Bachelor in Elementary Education major in Pre-school Education 
Bachelor in Secondary Education major in English, Filipino, Math and Social Studies
Bachelor of Science in Hotel and Restaurant Management
Bachelor of Science in Computer Engineering
Bachelor of Science in Electrical Engineering
Bachelor of Science in Mechanical Engineering
Bachelor of Science in Marine Engineering
Bachelor of Science in Marine Transportation
Bachelor of Science in Nursing
Bachelor of Science in Midwifery
Bachelor of Science in Electrical Technology
Bachelor of Science in Electronics Technology
Bachelor of Science in Industrial Technology
Bachelor of Science in Information Technology

Vocational programs
Ladderized education programs
2-year Consumer Electronics Servicing NC II leading to Bachelor of Science in Electronics Technology
2-year Food and Beverage NC II leading to Bachelor of Science in Hotel & Restaurant Management
2-year Computer Hardware Servicing NC II leading to Bachelor of Science in Information Technology
Terminal Programs
Diploma in Midwifery
Automotive Servicing NC II
Consumer Electronics Servicing NC II
Housekeeping NC II 
Building Wiring Installation NC II
Electrical Installation & Maintenance NC II

Basic education programs
High School Program 
Senior High School (Grades 11–12)
Academic Tracks:
Accountancy, Business and Management(ABM) Strand, Humanities and Social Sciences (HumSS) Strand, Science, Technology, Engineering and Mathematics (STEM) Strand, General Academics (GAs) Strand, Pre-Bacc. Maritime Specialization
Technical-Vocational Livelihood Tracks:
Home Economics Strand (Housekeeping and Food & Beverages Services), ICT Strand (Computer Programming), Industrial Arts Strand (Automotive Servicing NC II, Consumer Electronics Servicing and Electrical Installation Maintenance)
Sports Track
Junior High School (Grades 7–10)
Grade School Program (Grades 1 - 6)
Pre-School Program
Kinder
Preparatory

References

Education in Tuguegarao
Universities and colleges in Cagayan